William Frederick Burr (born June 10, 1968) is an American stand-up comedian, actor, filmmaker, and podcaster. He has released multiple stand-up comedy specials, most notably Why Do I Do This? (2008), Let It Go (2010), You People Are All the Same (2012), I'm Sorry You Feel That Way (2014), Walk Your Way Out (2017), Paper Tiger (2019), and Live at Red Rocks (2022). He received a Grammy Award for Best Comedy Album nomination for Paper Tiger, and a Primetime Emmy Award for Outstanding Actor in a Short Form Comedy or Drama Series nomination for the dark comedy series Immoral Compass (2021–present). In 2017, Rolling Stone ranked Burr No. 17 in their "50 Best Stand Up Comics of All Time".

Burr also created, co-wrote, and voiced the lead character in the Netflix animated sitcom F Is for Family (2015–2021). His other notable acting roles include appearing in various sketches in the second season of Chappelle's Show, Patrick Kuby in the AMC series Breaking Bad (2011–2013), Migs Mayfeld in the Disney+ series The Mandalorian (2019–present), and Ray Bishop in the film The King of Staten Island (2020). He has hosted the twice-weekly Monday Morning Podcast since 2007 and co-founded the All Things Comedy network in 2012.

Early life
William Frederick Burr was born in Canton, Massachusetts, on June 10, 1968, the son of nurse Linda Ann (née Wigent) and dentist Robert Edmund Burr. He is of German and Irish descent. He graduated from high school in 1987. In 1993, he obtained a bachelor's degree in radio from Emerson College in Boston, where one of his professors was the writer David Foster Wallace. He worked in warehouses before starting his comedy career, later stating that he enjoyed the freedom of the job: "If my boss gave me a rough time, I could just get on a forklift and just, like, drive away."

Career

Burr first performed stand-up comedy at the age of 23 on March 2, 1992. He moved to New York City in 1994. Since May 2007, Burr has recorded a weekly one-hour podcast, Bill Burr's Monday Morning Podcast, in which he speaks about his experiences, current events, going on tour, and sports, and offers advice to questions submitted by the listeners. The podcast is available on Burr's website, Spotify, YouTube, and on the All Things Comedy network he co-founded in 2012. He is sometimes joined by his wife Nia and has featured guests and interviews with other comedians.

Burr also appears as a guest on radio shows and other comedians' podcasts, such as Opie and Anthony, You Made It Weird with Pete Holmes, The Adam Carolla Show, The Joe Rogan Experience, WTF with Marc Maron, The Nerdist Podcast, The Adam Buxton Podcast, and Nobody Likes Onions. Burr was also the first guest on Tom Green's podcast. On April 18, 2011, he guest hosted the Hollywood Babble-On podcast alongside Ralph Garman.

On August 21, 2022, he became the first comedian to perform at Fenway Park, in front of a sold out crowd of around 35,000 people; it was also the largest comedy show in the history of Boston. Burr has had sold-out shows at Madison Square Garden on November 14, 2015, the Royal Albert Hall on June 6, 2018, and consecutive shows on March 4 and 5, 2019. He holds the record for the most consecutive sold-out shows at the Wilbur Theatre, where he performed 19 sold-out shows in a row, almost doubling the record of 10 set by Aziz Ansari. Burr sold out 20,000 seats at the Los Angeles Forum on September 28, 2018. On Sep 16, 2021, he sold out Red Rocks Amphitheatre.

In the 2008 video game Grand Theft Auto IV, Burr voiced Jason Michaels of the biker gang The Lost MC in the mission "No Love Lost". In 2009, he reprised his role in the game's expansion pack The Lost and Damned.

Burr's first hour-long special, Why Do I Do This? (2008), was filmed in New York. Burr's special Let it Go was recorded at The Fillmore in San Francisco and premiered on Comedy Central on September 18, 2010. A later special, You People Are All the Same, premiered in 2012 as a Netflix exclusive. In 2014, Burr filmed his fourth hour-long special I'm Sorry You Feel That Way at the Tabernacle Theater in Atlanta, Georgia. Unusual for modern comedy specials, the film was shot in black and white. He was also a regular on Chappelle's Show.

Burr appeared in the movie Date Night as Detective Walsh. He has also appeared in the fourth and fifth seasons of AMC's Breaking Bad as Patrick Kuby. He played Mark Mullins in the 2013 buddy cop film The Heat.

Burr voiced lead character Frank Murphy in F Is for Family, which premiered on Netflix on December 18, 2015. The show, an animated sitcom he created and co-wrote, drew on Burr's stand-up and the absurdity of political correctness. Season 4 of the series debuted on Netflix on June 12, 2020. Burr writes and executive produces the series along with Michael Price. Burr's fifth hour-long special, Bill Burr: Walk Your Way Out, debuted on Netflix on January 31, 2017. He appeared in the third episode (titled "Bill Burr") of the second season of the HBO series Crashing.

Burr's stand-up special You People Are All the Same was the first to premiere exclusively on Netflix, while his series F Is for Family was the first original Netflix animated series. His sixth hour-long special, Paper Tiger, debuted on Netflix on September 10, 2019. He premiered a new podcast co-hosted with fellow comedian Bert Kreischer, called the Bill Bert Podcast, in October. In December, he played Migs Mayfeld in two episodes of the Disney+ series The Mandalorian.

On October 10, 2020, Burr hosted NBC's Saturday Night Live for the first time.

In March 2022, it was announced that Burr will make his feature directorial debut with Old Dads, which he will also write and star in. A few months later, he received a Primetime Emmy Award for Outstanding Actor in a Short Form Comedy or Drama Series nomination for the dark comedy series Immoral Compass (2021–present). His seventh stand-up special, Live at Red Rocks, was released on July 12.

All Things Comedy 
All Things Comedy was officially launched on October 1, 2012, with a roster of 11 podcasts including Burr's own Monday Morning Podcast, The Long Shot Podcast by Eddie Pepitone, and Skeptic Tank by Ari Shaffir. By 2014, the network had six dozen members and over fifty podcasts. The network was started out by comedians Al Madrigal and Bill Burr with The Daily Show on the All Things Comedy website. The network was established as an artist owned cooperative, which Madrigal and Burr emphasize as an important aspect of the collective. All Things Records was started in March 2014 and released three albums in the months following its creation including Believe in Yourself by Sam Tripoli, Live at the Comedy Castle by Brian Scolaro, This Will Make an Excellent Horcrux by Jackie Kashian. Madrigal sees the network as a way of improving representation of Latin American people in media. For instance, the networks provides Spanish-language podcasts such as Leyendas Legendarias and El Dollop. Comedy Central partnered with All Things Comedy to produce a documentary about Patrice O'Neal as well as three comedy specials.

Style
Burr has been referred to as a "comedian's comedian" by observers of the American stand-up comedy circuit.

Rolling Stone magazine called Burr "the undisputed heavyweight champ of rage-fueled humor". Burr often portrays himself as "that loud guy in the bar" with "uninformed logic". In an interview with The Boston Globe, Burr stated, "I'm the 'dude, bro' guy." According to the Montreal Gazette, Burr is "a cynic and a contrarian who has never paid any heed to political correctness". The New York Times in 2013 called Burr "one of the funniest, most distinctive voices in the country for years". His set typically spans an array of topics ranging from his childhood to sex robots to how much he loves his dog. When he does touch on a cringeworthy subject, his style lends him the ability to anticipate and even toy with the crowd's reaction. Burr will stand there, casually leaning one arm on the mike stand, a mischievous grin on his face, acting like the loud guy at a bar.

Burr has cited Richard Pryor, George Carlin, Bill Cosby, Sam Kinison, and Patrice O'Neal as the five greatest stand-up comedians of all time.

Politics
Burr describes himself as a liberal who supports gun control and abortion rights.

Burr voted for Green Party candidate Ralph Nader in the 2000 United States presidential election. In 2016, Burr said he voted for neither Hillary Clinton nor Donald Trump stating that he was not fond of either candidate.

In an interview with Forbes, Burr stated his belief that political correctness does not address the problems it is aimed at fixing (such as racism) because it only focuses on the vocabulary people use rather than changing the attitudes that people have. He has also said that political correctness has no answer for, or impact on, other major socio-political issues such as the power held by banks and pharmaceutical companies.

In 2021, Burr criticized Republican governor Ron DeSantis banning mask mandates in Florida.

Personal life
Burr married actress and producer Nia Renee Hill in 2013. They have a daughter (born January 20, 2017) and a son (born June 2020). They reside in Los Angeles. Hill sometimes appears as a guest on his podcast.

Burr is a licensed helicopter pilot and enjoys playing drums. He has cited John Bonham and Dave Lombardo as his favorite drummers. He enjoys heavy metal music and is a fan of bands such as AC/DC, Iron Maiden, Led Zeppelin, Metallica, Meshuggah, Ministry, Pantera, Gojira, Karnivool, and Slayer. He has discussed his love of smoking cigars.

Filmography

Film

Television

Podcast

Video games

Comedy albums and specials

References

External links

 
 
 

1968 births
20th-century American comedians
21st-century American comedians
20th-century American male actors
21st-century American male actors
American male comedians
American male film actors
American male television actors
American people of French descent
American people of German descent
American people of Irish descent
American podcasters
American stand-up comedians
Comedians from Massachusetts
Critics of religions
Emerson College alumni
Living people
Male actors from Massachusetts
People from Canton, Massachusetts
Third Man Records artists